Cheng Han (303 or 304 – 347) was a dynastic state of China listed as one of the Sixteen Kingdoms in Chinese historiography. Ruled by the Di people, its territory was based in what is modern-day Sichuan Province, China.

Cheng and Han 
It represented two states, the Cheng state (成 Chéng) and the Han state (漢 Hàn). Cheng was proclaimed in 304 by Li Xiong, while Han was proclaimed in 338 by Li Shou. Since they were both ruled by the Li family of the Ba ethnicity, scholars often combine them into a single Cheng Han state in historiography. The Li family has also been described as being of Ba-Di ethnicity, they were originally Ba from modern Sichuan who had settled among the Di in modern Gansu. Western texts frequently referred to the two states separately. Whether the treatment is correct is debatable.

When Li Shou claimed the throne in 338, he did not acknowledge his throne as having been inherited from Li Xiong's line. While he continued to worship Li Xiong, it was done in a separate temple. However, Li Shou's son Li Shi, acknowledged the prior emperors including Li Xiong as his predecessors. Cheng Han's was the earliest establishment of the Sixteen Kingdoms.

All rulers of the Cheng Han declared themselves "emperors".

The commonly accepted founding year of Cheng has been 304. Nevertheless, Li Te declared a new era name in 303. Some scholars consider this self-declaration of era name to be a symbol of a new government. However, at that time, Li Te claimed no imperial or other special titles for himself.

The Cheng Han was eventually conquered by the Jin when Huan Wen attacked Chengdu.

Rulers of Cheng Han

Family tree

See also
Ba
Di (Wu Hu)
List of past Chinese ethnic groups
Wu Hu
Sixteen Kingdoms
Huan Wen
Sichuan
Eight Immortals from Sichuan

References

Citations

Sources 

 Kleeman, Terry F., Great Perfection: Religion and Ethnicity in a Chinese Millennial Kingdom, .

 
Dynasties in Chinese history
Former countries in Chinese history
304 establishments
4th-century establishments in China
347 disestablishments
4th-century disestablishments in China
Former kingdoms